Harold "Tre" Houston (born 23 March 1990) is a Bermudian sprinter who specializes in the 100 and 200 metres. Houston competed in the 200 metres at the 2015 World Championships in Beijing without advancing from the first round. A year later Houston would compete at the 2016 Olympic Games in Rio de Janeiro. Houston, who qualified with a personal best of 20.42, would go on to place sixth in his heat with a time of 20.85. Houston's appearance in the 200 meters would mark the first time in over 20 years Bermuda had been represented in the event.

Competition record

1Disqualified in the semifinals

Personal bests
Outdoor
100 metres – 10.28 (+1.6 m/s, Leonara, Guyana 2016)
200 metres – 20.42 (+0.9 m/s, San Marcos 2015) 
400 metres – 48.51 (Houston, Texas USA 2015)
Indoor
60 metres – 6.79 (Houston, Texas USA)
200 metres – 21.44 (College Station, Texas USA)

References

External links

1990 births
Living people
Bermudian male sprinters
Athletes (track and field) at the 2010 Commonwealth Games
Athletes (track and field) at the 2014 Commonwealth Games
Athletes (track and field) at the 2018 Commonwealth Games
Commonwealth Games competitors for Bermuda
Athletes (track and field) at the 2011 Pan American Games
Athletes (track and field) at the 2015 Pan American Games
Pan American Games competitors for Bermuda
World Athletics Championships athletes for Bermuda
Place of birth missing (living people)
Athletes (track and field) at the 2016 Summer Olympics
Olympic athletes of Bermuda